420 (four hundred [and] twenty) is the natural number following 419 and preceding 421.

In mathematics
420 is:
the sum of four consecutive primes (101 + 103 + 107 + 109).
the sum of the first 20 positive even numbers.
a zero of the Mertens function and is sparsely totient.
a pronic number.
the smallest number divisible by the numbers 1 to 7, and as a consequence of that it is a Harshad number in every base from 2 to 10 except base 5.
a 141-gonal number.
a balanced number.

In other fields
420 is a slang term that refers to the consumption of cannabis. April 20th is commonly celebrated as a holiday dedicated to the drug, due to the numerical form of the day being 4/20.
420 is the country calling code for Czech Republic.

References 

Integers
Internet memes